Shirk Hall is a historic building located on the campus of Franklin College in Franklin, Johnson County, Indiana. It was built in 1903 and is a one-story, Classical Revival style brick building on a raised basement.  It is topped by a cross-gabled roof and copper dome on an octagonal base. The front entrance features engaged Ionic order columns.  The building housed the school library until 1964. The building is now home to the college's media school, The Pulliam School of Journalism.

It was listed on the National Register of Historic Places in 1975.

References

University and college buildings on the National Register of Historic Places in Indiana
Libraries on the National Register of Historic Places in Indiana
Neoclassical architecture in Indiana
Library buildings completed in 1903
Buildings and structures in Johnson County, Indiana
National Register of Historic Places in Johnson County, Indiana